Jinghu may refer to:

Jinghu (instrument) (京胡), Chinese bowed string instrument in the huqin family

Places
Jinghu District (镜湖区), a district in Wuhu, Anhui, China
Jinghu Subdistrict (镜湖街道), a subdistrict in Ningjiang District, Songyuan, Jilin, China
Jinghu Circuit (荆湖路), a circuit or province of the Song dynasty

Beijing/Shanghai
Jinghu (京沪), a colloquial term referring to Beijing and Shanghai, two of the largest cities in China
Jinghu Expressway, road linking Beijing to Shanghai in China
Jinghu railway, train line running between Beijing and Shanghai in China
Beijing–Shanghai high-speed railway, high speed railway between Beijing and Shanghai in China